Alifushi (Dhivehi: އަލިފުށި) is one of the inhabited islands of Raa Atoll in the Maldives.

History

Powell Islands
Alifushi and Etthingili were named as the Powell Islands by Captain Robert Moresby after Lieutenant F.F. Powell, who assisted during the difficult survey of the Atolls of the Maldives in 1834–36. Later promoted to captain, Powell went on to survey the northwest coast of Ceylon.

Geography
Alifushi and Etthingili (Powell Islands in the Admiralty Chart) stand on a detached reef of their own with very deep waters (no sounding), between this isolated reef shelf and the northern end of the main Northern Maalhosmadulhu Atoll.

Demography

Economy
This island is renowned for its carpenters and boat builders.

References

Islands of the Maldives